Marcel Granollers Pujol (born 12 April 1986) is a Spanish professional tennis player. He reached his career-high singles ranking of world No. 19 in July 2012, and his career-high doubles ranking of world No. 4 in February 2013. Granollers has won four ATP singles titles and 24 doubles titles, including the 2012 ATP World Tour Finals. He has also reached the men's doubles finals at the 2014 French Open, the 2014 and 2019 US Open, and the 2021 Wimbledon Championships.

Personal life
Granollers' brother Gerard is also a tennis player, and they have won five Challenger doubles titles together.

Career

2006: Breaking top 200
Granollers made the first round of the Wimbledon tournament in 2006, but lost to Andrei Pavel. In the qualifying rounds, he beat Stéphane Robert, Konstantinos Economidis and Marco Chiudinelli.

2007: Breaking top 150
In 2007, Granollers won the Naples and Rome Challengers for doubles with Flavio Cipolla, and the Maspalomas Challenger for doubles with Marc López. At the 2007 French Open, he made the second round of the men's doubles tournament with Feliciano López before they lost in three close sets to the number 4 seeds Fabrice Santoro and Nenad Zimonjić, who won 7–5, 1–6, 6–4. He lost at the French and Wimbledon Championships both times in the second round of qualifying for the main draws.

2008: Breaking top 60 & first singles title
2008 saw Granollers qualify for the Australian Open Singles Draw, but lost to Evgeny Korolev in straight sets in the first round. He reached the quarterfinals of the 2008 Abierto Mexicano Telcel in Acapulco, Mexico, an International Series Gold tournament, before losing to José Acasuso 7–6, 6–3. On 20 April, he won his first ATP singles title at the U.S. Men's Clay Court Championships, defeating World No. 8 James Blake in the final. He had saved two match points in the semifinals. The previous day, he and Pablo Cuevas lost in the doubles final.
Following Rafael Nadal's announcement that he would not play the Davis Cup Final at Argentina on 21–23 November, Spain's Captain Emilio Sánchez announced that Marcel Granollers would replace Nadal. This was Granollers' first Davis Cup appearance, although he did not play any matches.

2009: Three doubles titles, Breaking top 25 in doubles
In 2009, Granollers won three ATP doubles titles at the 2009 Brasil Open, the 2009 Copa Telmex, and the 2009 Kremlin Cup, teaming up with Tommy Robredo, Alberto Martín, and Pablo Cuevas respectively.

2010: First ATP 500 singles final
In the first round of the 2010 Australian Open, Granollers pulled off a remarkable comeback when he recovered from 2 sets down against world no.8 and French Open finalist, Robin Söderling. He then lost to Alejandro Falla in the 2nd round.

2011: Breaking top 30 in singles, First ATP 500 title
Granollers lost in the first round of the Australian Open to eventual champion Novak Djokovic, and he didn't win consecutive matches until the 2011 Miami Masters, where he got to the fourth round. 

In July, he beat Stanislas Wawrinka, Mikhail Youzhny, and Fernando Verdasco to win his first title of the year and his second career title at the Swiss Open. In the US Open, he reached the third round of a Grand Slam for the first time in his career, to break into the top 30. 

In November, Granollers claimed the title at the Valencia Open by defeating Juan Mónaco in three sets and said, "Winning here has been the biggest achievement in my whole career." He beat four Top 20 players: Alexandr Dolgopolov, Marin Čilić, Gaël Monfils and Juan Martín del Potro en route to the final at the ATP World Tour 500 tournament.

Granollers played for the victorious Spain Davis Cup team in 2011, losing the doubles rubber (with Fernando Verdasco) in the quarterfinal against United States.

2012: Top 20 singles debut, ATP Finals & First Masters doubles titles
Marcel Granollers reached the fourth round of a Grand Slam for the first time at French Open, losing to David Ferrer in three straight sets. Granollers lost to Marin Čilić in the final match of Croatia Open on 15 July 2012. 

Playing doubles alongside countryman Marc López, he went 3–4 in finals, winning titles at the Italian Open, Swiss Open and the ATP World Tour Finals. 
Granollers and Lopez were the first Spanish pair to play at the season-ending championships since Sergio Casal and Emilio Sánchez in 1994.  They won the title defeating Indian duo Mahesh Bhupathi and Rohan Bopanna in the final. 

He also partnered López at the 2012 Summer Olympics.

2013: Success in doubles as World No. 4 & in singles with Fourth title
Granollers reached a career-high ranking of World No. 4 in doubles on 25 February 2013.
 
He made it also to the fourth round of the US Open in singles for the first time, where he lost to top-seed Novak Djokovic in straight sets.

2014: US & French Open doubles runner-ups, Two Masters semis
In 2014, he had a very consistent doubles performances at the French and US Opens, making the finals at both events with partner Marc López. They qualified for their third consecutive ATP Finals where they lost in the round robin stage for a second year in a row.

2015–18: Second Masters doubles title, Three Masters finals

Granollers suffered a significant loss in form, with only one tour-level late round appearance: the semifinals in Zagreb Indoors losing to Andreas Seppi. His 2015 year-end singles ranking dropped to No. 84. 

He reached the quarterfinals of the 2016 Monte-Carlo Rolex Masters before losing to Gaël Monfils in straight sets, making the main draw as a lucky loser. 

Granollers reached the finals in both the 2015 and 2017 Masters 1000 in Rome. He also reached the final of the 2017 Rolex Paris Masters in doubles with Ivan Dodig and in the following year 2018, he won the Masters 1000 title in Paris with Rajeev Ram.

2019–21: New partnership: US Open & Wimbledon finals, 4 Masters titles, back to top 5
With his new partner Horacio Zeballos Granollers won 6 titles thus far, starting in August 2019, and also made his first Grand Slam doubles final at the 2019 US Open, losing to the World No. 1 and top seeded pair Farah/Cabal. 

The pair won 3 Masters 1000: the 2019 Canadian Open, the 2020 Italian Open and the 2021 Mutua Madrid Open. As a result, he reentered the top 10 in doubles at World No. 9 on 9 September 2019 and  No. 7 on 21 September 2020. 
He also reentered the top 5 on 12 July 2021 following the final at the 2021 Wimbledon Championships where they lost to World No. 1 and top seeds Mektic/Pavic.

In August 2021, they reached a second Masters 1000 final for 2021 and fourth overall at the 2021 Western & Southern Open in Cincinnati defeating Arévalo/Fognini. They defeated Austin Krajicek and Steve Johnson in the final to win their fourth Masters.

2022: Two Major semis, 5 Masters quarters, Third straight ATP Finals
Granollers and Zebalos qualified for their third consecutive ATP finals, having advanced to the semifinals of the year-end championships in 2020 and 2021. It was Granollers seventh participation.

Playing style
Granollers' good serve and net skills account for his excellent doubles record. His comparatively technically weak groundstrokes are underpowered with low takebacks on both wings but they provide a decent defensive framework. He is also known for his heavy grunting, so much as to result in ridicule and accusations of gamesmanship due to its loud volume and questionable timing during matches.

Significant finals

Grand Slam finals

Doubles: 4 (4 runner-ups)

Year-end championships finals

Doubles: 1 (1 title)

Masters 1000 finals

Doubles: 12 (6 titles, 6 runner-ups)

ATP career finals

Singles: 7 (4 titles, 3 runner-ups)

Doubles: 47 (24 titles, 23 runner-ups)

Challenger and Futures finals

Singles: 27 (13–14)

Doubles: 39 (31 titles, 8 runners-up)

Performance timelines

Singles
Current through the 2023 BNP Paribas Open.

Doubles

Wins over top 10 players
He has a  record against players who were, at the time the match was played, ranked in the top 10.

Notes

References

External links

 Official website 
 
 
 
 
 

1986 births
Living people
Tennis players from Catalonia
French Open junior champions
Spanish male tennis players
Tennis players from Barcelona
Tennis players at the 2012 Summer Olympics
Olympic tennis players of Spain
Grand Slam (tennis) champions in boys' doubles